Deculturalization is the process by which an ethnic group is forced to abandon its language, culture, and customs. It is the destruction of the culture of a dominated group and its replacement by the culture of the dominating group. Deculturalization is a slow process due to its extensive goal of fully replacing the subordinate ethnic group's culture, language, and customs. This term is often confused with assimilation and acculturation.

Methods of deculturalization 
 Geographical segregation
 Forbidding education to the dominated group
 Forceful replacing of language
 Superior culture's curriculum in schools
 Instructors are from the dominant group
 Avoiding the dominated group's culture in curriculum

Deculturalization in the United States

African Americans 
The enslavement of African Americans during the 18th and 19th centuries in the United States is a form of deculturalization. Slavery in the United States made the African Americans dependent on their owners allowing for the owners to exploit them. The owners removed their African names, did not allow them to read, and did not allow them to practice their culture and language. Deculturalization of African Americans stems back to When the African American slaves were forbidden access to education due to fear of a slave revolt against the slaveholders. A series of court cases occurred in the United States helping deculturalization of African Americans as wells as there were cases that went against deculturalization. For example, the addition of the 14th Amendment to the United States Constitution, the Dred Scott v. Sandford decision, Brown v. Board of Education, Plessy v. Ferguson, and countless others. After the Civil War (United States) segregated education continued and was a struggle to integrate fully and completely. While integration was achieved, the textbooks that the African American students learn from are bias and contain material from the dominant, Anglo-American culture.

Latin Americans 
The deculturalization of Latinos can refer back to the Mexican–American War and The Treaty Of Guadalupe Hidalgo. Once the United States won California, Texas, New Mexico, Arizona, Nevada, Utah, and parts of Wyoming and Colorado Mexicans who were living in these areas were removed from their lands. Their identity in the United States changed constantly from Mexican to White and vice versa until the word Hispanic was created to refer to these Mexican Americans. By simply using the word Hispanic to refer to the Mexican Americans and later the Latin-American immigrants refers to the conqueror's culture-the Spanish culture. Latinos in the United States also had segregated schooling. In schools they were given second-hand material from the wealthy, Anglo schools. When Latinos were being integrated, they as well as the African Americans, were being taught from bias, Anglo-cultured, Anglo-praising textbooks. Latinos did have a win to have bilingual education. While they were allowed to have bilingual education, the primary, enforced language is the English one. In some schools Latinos were corporally punished for speaking Spanish in the classroom. In some universities, Latinos were also forced to take many speech classes in order to remove the accents of the Latinos when they spoke English. While that is not seen evidently in schools anymore, the education system continues to enforce English, Anglo-American customs, culture and language as the dominant one.

Asian Americans 
Asian Americans began to be deculturalized by not being allowed to be naturalized, the Chinese-Exclusion Act, Japanese Internment, forbidding land ownership, and enforcing the Anglo-culture onto them. The Naturalization Act of 1790 did not allow for the Chinese along with other Asians to become naturalized, because the naturalization process was limited only to the Anglo community in the United States. In terms of schooling, in some cases Asian Americans were denied an education entirely. It was not until the 1900s when Asian Americans were allowed to receive an education through the implementation of certain provisions. In 1855, the Chan Yong case fortified that the Chinese are not "white" therefore ineligible for citizenship due to the Naturalization Act of 1790.  Also, in 1922, the court case Ozawa v. United States, the Japanese man understood he was not allowed to be naturalized due to the former act, but asked for the Japanese to be considered white, but was denied the request. The Ozawa v. United States shows how some Asians would rather refer to themselves as white than as Japanese or their individual ethnic group, because of the advantages that being "white" bring. The enforced Anglo-American culture upon the Asians and using them during the Cold War as a model minority that the United States is not racist, it is the individual's fault allows for deculturalization to be successful. Jade Snow Wong is a Chinese-American writer who was used by the American government to travel to the Asian world and show how an Asian can succeed in America.

Indigenous Americans 
Once the first settlement in Jamestown 1607 occurred, the Pre-American deculturalization process began. When the English came to America they looked to the Native Americans as "pagans" and "savages". Native Americans believed that the land was not property, a thing to be claimed and owned. Once the English settlers arrived this was one of the major culture difference that needed to be extinguished. The idea of private property and ownership was enforced upon the Native Americans. While even those who accepted it, because they understood the consequences, their lands were taken away. They wanted to impose the traditional "Christian" nuclear family as well among the Native Americans. In order to gain success the colonists made Native American Educational Programs. Christian missionaries such as John Eliot learned the Native American language in order to convert them into Christianity began the segregation among the "pagans" and the "holy". The Native Americans were exploited. There was a cultural genocide and simply genocide against the Native Americans. From the Trail of Tears to the appropriation of their designs in order to gain capital, corporate gains.

See also 
 Cultural genocide
 Forced assimilation
 Institutional racism
 Americanization (immigration)
 Acculturation
 Linguistic discrimination
 Language death

References 

Cultural studies
Ethnicity